Prague 16 is a municipal district (městská část) of Prague. It has about 8,500 inhabitants. It is located in the south-western part of the city. It is formed by one cadastre, Radotín. 

The administrative district (správní obvod) of the same name consists of municipal districts Prague 16, Lipence, Lochkov, Velká Chuchle and Zbraslav.

See also

SC Radotín
Olympia Radotín

References

External links

Districts of Prague